Angela Mazzarelli  is an associate justice of the New York Appellate Division of the Supreme Court, First Judicial Department.

Early life and education
She attended the primary and secondary schools of the Southboro, Massachusetts Public School System. She is also a 1968 graduate of Brandeis University and a 1971 graduate of Columbia Law School.

Legal career
She worked as a Staff Attorney for Bronx Legal Services between 1971 and 1973. She was then a Special Assistant to the General Counsel for the Housing and Development Administration. She was a Law Assistant to the Board of Justices of the Civil Term of the New York Supreme Court between 1973 and 1977 as well as a Principal Law Assistant to one of the Justices of the Supreme Court between 1978 and 1980. She worked in private practice between 1980 and 1985.

She subsequently served on the New York City Civil Court between 1985 and 1988. She was a New York Supreme Court Justice from 1988 to 1994. She was designated a Justice for the Appellate Division, First Judicial Department in 1994 by Governor Mario Cuomo.

References

Living people
New York (state) lawyers
Columbia Law School alumni
Year of birth missing (living people)